Dopasia wegneri, Wegner's glass lizard, is a species of lizard of the Anguidae family. It is found on Sumatra in Indonesia.

References

Dopasia
Reptiles described in 1959
Reptiles of Indonesia
Endemic fauna of Indonesia
Taxa named by Robert Mertens